School 13, also known as Boys Vocational High School and Buffalo Alternative High School, is a historic school building located at Buffalo in Erie County, New York.  It was built about 1915, and is a three-story, steel framed building sheathed in brick and terra cotta with Beaux-Arts style design elements.  The "T"-shaped building housed administrative offices, classrooms, a gymnasium, swimming pool, and two-story auditorium.  The building housed a school until 2003.

It was listed on the National Register of Historic Places in 2005.

References

External links
 School 13 - U.S. National Register of Historic Places on Waymarking.com

Beaux-Arts architecture in New York (state)
School buildings completed in 1915
Schools in Buffalo, New York
School buildings on the National Register of Historic Places in New York (state)
National Register of Historic Places in Buffalo, New York
1915 establishments in New York (state)